The Phillips Panda was one of a number of mopeds produced by the Phillips Cycles company of England in the 1950s and early 1960s. The factory also produced the slightly more expensive   Phillips Gadabout models.

Phillips Cycles Ltd. was a respected British bicycle manufacturer based in Bridge Street, Smethwick, England.   Founded by J.A. Phillips and E.W Bohle in Birmingham around 1892, its history  ended in the 1970s, by which time it had become part of Raleigh Industries, itself a part of the huge Tube Investments group. For a number of years, the company was the second-largest bicycle producer in Britain after Raleigh.  The "Phillips" brand is still used around the world, especially in China and the Far East, having been licensed by Raleigh.

General Description

The single-speed Panda Mark 1 and 2 utilised what probably became the last manufacturing installation of the 49 cc German Rex cyclemotor engine, which first appeared around 1950 in the form of a front-mounted, belt-driven cycle attachment, the strong but basic Panda frame being specifically built to house the motor.

The Rex engine at 6:1 compression has no bhp given but carries a 12-millimetre Bing carburettor to the aluminium barrel with sleeve liner in conventional fore & aft porting layout. The crankcase cavity unusually extends all the way to the back of the motor to include lubrication of the reduction gear and its bearings by the induction gases! This results in a  reduced scavenge pressure. Mounted on the end of the output shaft with the sprocket inboard, the tiny 2½" Rex dry clutch is a particularly frail pull-operated device and typically responsible for the final demise of most machines.

The Panda has a 'grip-locking' clutch lever and a carburettor set-up that provides a very reliable and steady tick-over.  The rear brake comprises a back pedal Perry Coaster hub and a conventional bicycle-type hub brake, handlebar lever operated for the front brake.

Mark 1 version had no suspension but the mark 2 had telescopic front forks, larger headlamp and deeper valanced rear mudguard  but retained the solid rear frame.

The electrical system comprised a Miller flywheel  magneto with lighting coils.

The final Panda mark 3 was simply an imported French Mobylette made by Motobécane badged as a Phillips.  It had nothing in common  with the previous home-produced models.

Technical specifications (Mark 1 and 2)
Engine:
Rex air-cooled, single cylinder, two-stroke
bore 40.5 mm
stroke 38.25 mm
capacity 49 cc
compression ratio 6:1
Single Gear Ratio 17.3:1
Clutch 
Rex Dry multi-plate
Carburettor 
Bing model 1/12/27
Ignition & Lighting 
Miller flywheel magneto 6 volt 18 watt (Headlamp 6 V 15/15 W, tail lamp 6 V 3 W)
Lubrication 
Petroil mixture 16:1
Fuel Tank 
Approx 4 litres including 0.4 litres reserve. 
Brakes: 
Front - 3.5 inch hub (mark 1), handlebar lever operated 
Rear - Back pedalling Perry Coaster Hub
Tyres 
23 X 2 inch with Schrader type valves
Size
Overall length 1820 mm, height 940 mm, width 152 mm

Total Weight 
 Approx 32 kg
Equipment
3.5 inch headlamp (mark 1), electric horn, bipod stand, rear carrier, tyre inflator, large tool bag and tool kit
Finish 
 Silver Grey with tank and fairings in Flamboyant Red

On the road
On sitting astride the Panda, ones first impression is immediately of how small the moped feels with its 23-inch wheels and upright riding position.   Starting the machine is easy with a push-down button choke on the Bing carburettor and decompressor lever on the right hand handlebar.   Once started on its stand with the clutch disengaged, the choke is reset by fully opening the twist-grip throttle momentarily.

Pulling away from rest is easily achievable without pedal assistance owing to the relatively high torque the motor delivers but this is not recommended practice as the frail clutch will fail rapidly with this sort of treatment.   Pedal assisted starts are therefore much recommended.   In fact, engine starting can be done by pedalling away from rest with the clutch engaged using the decompressor.

Once under way the machine pulls strongly up to about 25 mph but any increase tails off rapidly only just managing 30 mph in favourable conditions.  This is no doubt due to the fairly low single speed gearing but it does enable most hills to be tackled without resort to pedalling.

The Rex engine is, however, stoically consistent and reliable.  Always a reliable starter under all conditions and a reliable and consistent runner, though you do need time on your  side to enjoy the docile character of the machine. The low maximum speed is compensated for to some extent by a good fuel consumption of 180 – 200 mpg.    In common with most British-built two-stroke machines of the time, the petroil mixture ratio recommended is a little cautious erring on the 'oily' side at 16:1 using self-mixing two-stroke oil (16 parts of petrol to 1 part oil).  The manual advises stretching it to 20:1 if using SAE20 motor engine oil. This British tendency to add rather more oil than the Continentals gave two-strokes a 'blue smokey exhaust' reputation in the UK but the Panda exhaust is not particularly smokey.

The low riding position gives the moped a 'safe' feeling to ride and the sturdy cycle frame seems to plough through road bumps reasonably well despite having no suspension front or rear on the mark 1 version.

The Phillips Panda looks quite pleasant once the side panels are fitted, hiding the rather ugly frame construction in the engine mounting area.

Night riding is no problem but headlamp illumination is a little dismal at 15 watts and surprisingly has a main/dip feature!

Accessories available included a pair of plastic legshields and a windscreen.

As a reliable work horse, the Panda makes a sensible choice despite not having the performance of some of its continental competitors.  Phillips set out to produce a reliable machine that was cheaper than most of its rivals.  The Panda mark 1 cost £54-11s-0d in 1960.

Mopeds
Transport in Sandwell